Li Jianping, may refer to:

Jianping Li, a professor of meteorology at Institute of Atmospheric Physics, Chinese Academy of Sciences.

Li Jianping (born 1918), a politician, director of China Earthquake Administration, vice minister of Light Industry, vice minister of Geology, and vice minister of Fuel and Chemical Industries.

Li Jianping (born 1960), a former politician in Inner Mongolia and was placed under investigation in September 2018.